Sion is a railway station on the Central line of the Mumbai Suburban Railway network, located in the Mumbai neighborhood of Sion.

Its location near the Mithi River means that the railway between Sion and Kurla, directly to the north,  has flooded frequently during the Indian monsoon. However, in 2019, the Central Railway conducted work to raise the trackbed by four to six inches to prevent future flooding. Previously, 30 mm of rain in 24 hours flooded the track, but now there will be no disruption of services with 100 mm of rain per day.

Despite this work, the tracks near this station still experienced waterlogging and flooding during the 2019 floods in Mumbai.

References 

Railway stations in India opened in 1853
Mumbai CST-Kalyan rail line
Railway stations in Mumbai City district
Mumbai Suburban Railway stations